is an interchange passenger railway station located in Isogo-ku, Yokohama, Kanagawa Prefecture, Japan, operated by the East Japan Railway Company (JR East) and the Yokohama New Transit Company.

Lines
Shin-Sugita is also a terminal station for the Kanazawa Seaside Line.

Station layout 
The JR station consists of two opposed elevated platforms serving two tracks, with the station building underneath. The station has a "Midori no Madoguchi" staffed ticket office. The Kanazawa New Seaside Line has a single elevated bay platform.

JR platforms

Kanazawa Seaside Line platforms

History 
The area around Shin-Sugita Station was formerly a rural pocket within downtown Yokohama. The property was developed into a large housing district in the early 1970s. The Japanese National Railways (JNR) Keihin-Tōhoku Line was extended from its former terminus at Isogo Station, and Shin-Sugita Station was opened on 17 March 1970. The line was further extended to Ōfuna Station in 1973. The station came under the management of JR East on April 1, 1987 after the privatization of JNR. A new station building was completed in 1989. The station building was remodeled in 2007.

Passenger statistics
In fiscal 2019, the JR East station was used by an average of 36,810 passengers daily (boarding passengers only). During the same period,  the Yokohama New Transit station was used by an average of 32,090 passengers daily (boarding passengers only).

The passenger figures (boarding passengers only) for previous years are as shown below.

Surrounding area
 Sakae Ward Office
 Sakae Library
 Yokohama Sakae Mutual Aid Hospital
 Kanagawa Prefectural Hakuyo High School
 Hongodai Ekimae housing complex

See also
 List of railway stations in Japan

References

External links

 
Kanazawa Seaside Line home page

Railway stations in Kanagawa Prefecture
Railway stations in Japan opened in 1970
Keihin-Tōhoku Line
Negishi Line
Railway stations in Yokohama